Sam Perry (born 16 August 1995) is a New Zealand swimmer. He competed in the men's 100 metre freestyle event at the 2017 World Aquatics Championships.

References

External links

1995 births
Living people
Sportspeople from Hamilton, New Zealand
New Zealand male freestyle swimmers
Swimmers at the 2018 Commonwealth Games
Commonwealth Games competitors for New Zealand
Competitors at the 2015 Summer Universiade
Stanford Cardinal men's swimmers
20th-century New Zealand people
21st-century New Zealand people